Events from the year 1956 in Jordan.

Incumbents
Monarch: Hussein 
Prime Minister: 
 until 8 January: Ibrahim Hashem (acting)
 8 January-22 May: Samir al-Rifai 
 22 May-1 July: Sa`id al-Mufti  
 1 July-29 October: Ibrahim Hashem 
 starting 29 October: Suleiman Nabulsi

Events

Births

28 May - Khaled Mashal.

See also

 Years in Iraq
 Years in Syria
 Years in Saudi Arabia

References

 
1950s in Jordan
Jordan
Jordan
Years of the 20th century in Jordan